Tres may refer to:
 Tres (instrument), a Cuban musical instrument
 Tres, Trentino, municipality in Italy
 "Tres" (song) by Juanes
 "Tres", a song by Líbido from their album Hembra
 TrES, the Trans-Atlantic Exoplanet Survey
 Templi Resurgentes Equites Synarchici, a fictional secret society in the novel Foucault's Pendulum
 MTV Tres, an American cable network which targets programming towards young Hispanic-Americans
 Tea Research and Extension Station, Taiwan
 Tres (Fiel a la Vega album), 1999
Tres (Álvaro Torres album), 1985
 Tres (poetry collection), a 2000 collection of poems by Roberto Bolaño

See also

Los Tres, Chilean rock band
TRE3S, 2011 album by Mexican indie rock band Chikita Violenta
Tress (disambiguation)